Sergei Viktorovich Igumin (born 9 May 1958) is a former Russian Soviet football player.

Honours
 1977 FIFA World Youth Championship winner with the Soviet Union.

References

External links
 

1958 births
Living people
Soviet footballers
PFC CSKA Moscow players
FC SKA-Khabarovsk players
FC Asmaral Moscow players
FC Fakel Voronezh players
FC Arsenal Tula players
Soviet Top League players
Soviet football managers
FC Arsenal Tula managers
Association football defenders